Hylton Viaduct is a road traffic and pedestrian bridge spanning the River Wear in North East England, linking North Hylton and South Hylton in Sunderland as the A19 road. The steel box girder bridge was opened in 1974 by short hand typist and secretary Sandra McCann and is above a former chain ferry route which ceased in 1915.

Box girder bridges
Bridges across the River Wear
Bridges completed in 1974
Bridges in Tyne and Wear
Transport in the City of Sunderland
Road bridges in England